Leptoremus is a genus of antlike flower beetles in the family Anthicidae. There is one described species in Leptoremus, L. argenteus.

References

Further reading

 
 

Anthicidae
Articles created by Qbugbot